The 1991 Soviet Athletics Championships was the 63rd and final edition of the national championship in outdoor track and field for the Soviet Union. It was held on 10–13 July at Republican Stadium in Kiev, Ukrainian SSR. The competition was held within the 1991 Soviet Spartakiad. A total of 42 events were contested over four days. The marathon competition was held earlier on 21 April in Bila Tserkva.

The competition did not receive interest from several of the nation's top athletes, including Sergey Bubka, and audience attendance was also low. No team score was assigned for the Republics of the Soviet Union, as had been done in previous years. The championships formed part of the qualification for the Soviet team at the 1991 World Championships in Athletics. The highlight performance was Lyudmila Narozhilenko's Soviet national record of 12.28 seconds in the women's 100 metres hurdles. This made her the third fastest women ever in the event (after Bulgarians Yordanka Donkova and Ginka Zagorcheva) and remains one of the fastest performances of all time for the event.

This was the final Soviet Athletics Championships as the dissolution of the Soviet Union occurred in December that year. After this point, the newly independent republics began to hold their own national championships. Given the organisational disarray, the former Soviet states sent a Unified Team at the Olympics in 1992, which was selected through the 1992 CIS Athletics Championships – the last time the former Soviet countries held a united athletics event.

Results

Men

Women

Soviet Marathon Championships 
The Soviet Marathon Championships and Spartakiade Marathon took part within the same race on 21 April in the city of Bila Tserkva, though placings differed for men as under Spartakiade rules each Republic of the Soviet Union could enter a maximum of three athletes for their team. The top two placers in the men's race, Vladimir Bukhanov and Vadim Sidorov, were not part of a republic's team, hence they were declared first and second in the Soviet Championships, but the Spartakiade title went to the third placer, Aleksandr Vychuzhanin of the Russian SFSR. The level of participation was not as high in the women's race, thus the top three women were all part of a team and the Championships and Spartakiade results were identical.

Men

Women

Soviet Winter Racewalking Championships 
The Soviet Winter Racewalking Championships were held 16–17 February in Sochi. Participants competed on the route laid along Tchaikovsky Street. The women's 10 km winner Alina Ivanova finished one second slower than her Soviet record set in 1989.

Men

Women

Soviet Winter Throwing Championships 
The Soviet Winter Throwing Championships were held on 23–24 February in Adler at the Labor Reserves stadium. The women's hammer throw world record was improved twice at the meeting, first by Larisa Shtyrogrishnaya (63.08 m), and then by Alla Fyodorova (64.44 m).

Men

Women

Soviet Cross Country Championships 
The Soviet Cross Country Championships were held on 24 February in Kislovodsk, Russian SFSR.

Men

Women

References

Results
Soviet Championships. GBR Athletics. Retrieved 2019-07-20.
Волошина Л., Тихонов С. А праздника не получилось. С X летней Спартакиады народов СССР // Лёгкая атлетика : журнал. – 1991. – No. 9. – С. 2–3.
Спартакиада народов СССР и чемпионат СССР // Лёгкая атлетика : журнал. – 1991. – No. 9. – С. 4–5.
Сорокин Э. Герои и неудачники. Чемпионат СССР по марафонскому бегу в программе X летней Спартакиады народов СССР // Лёгкая атлетика : журнал. – 1991. – No. 6. – С. 11.
На стадионах страны и мира. Чемпионат СССР по кроссу // Лёгкая атлетика : журнал. – 1991. – No. 5. – С. 46.
На стадионах страны и мира. Чемпионат СССР по спортивной ходьбе // Лёгкая атлетика : журнал. – 1991. – No. 5. – С. 47.

Soviet Athletics Championships
Soviet Athletics Championships
Soviet Athletics Championships
Soviet Athletics Championships
Sports competitions in Kyiv
Athletics competitions in Ukraine
Athletics in Kyiv
June 1991 sports events in Europe